Sphingomonas azotifigens  is a nitrogen-fixing bacteria from the genus of Sphingomonas which has been isolated from the root of a rice plant (Oryza sativa) in Mishima in Japan.

References

Further reading

External links
Type strain of Sphingomonas azotifigens at BacDive -  the Bacterial Diversity Metadatabase

azotifigens
Bacteria described in 2006